Hidaka (Japanese: 日高 sun-tall) may refer to:

People
 Hidaka (surname)
 Princess Hidaka, birth name of Empress Genshō

Places in Japan

Populated places

 Hidaka, Saitama, a city in Saitama Prefecture
 Hidaka, Kōchi, a village in Kochi Prefecture
 Hidaka, Hyōgo, a former town in Hyōgo Prefecture
 Hidaka, Wakayama, a town in Hidaka District in Wakayama Prefecture
 Hidaka, Hokkaidō, a town in Hidaka Subprefecture, Hokkaidō

Administrative divisions

 Hidaka District, Wakayama in Wakayama Prefecture
 Hidaka District, Hokkaidō, a district in Hidaka Subprefecture, Hokkaidō
 Hidaka Subprefecture, a subprefecture of Hokkaidō

Geographic features

 Hidaka Mountains, a mountain range in Hokkaidō
 Hidaka Pass, a mountain pass in the Hidaka Mountains